Levi Asher (or Marc Eliot Stein; 18 November 1961 in Queens, New York) is a New York-based writer, blogger and web developer responsible for Literary Kicks, one of the earliest popular literary websites and now the oldest continuously-running literary website on the Internet. Other works by Levi Asher include Queensboro Ballads, a series of stories and essays in the form of a 1960s folk-rock album, Coffeehouse: Writings From The Web, the first anthology of online writing, Notes From Underground, a digital movie version of the Dostoevsky novel, Action Poetry, a compilation of writings from Literary Kicks, The Summer of the Mets, a novel and Pacifism for the 21st Century, a website devoted to the philosophy of pacifism.

Having maintained Literary Kicks continuously since 1994 (with brief pauses in 2000 and 2004), Levi Asher is now recognized as a pioneer of the online literary scene and one of the earliest proto-bloggers. As a professional web developer (using the name Marc Eliot Stein), Asher has also built or collaborated on music websites for Bob Dylan, Bruce Springsteen and Pearl Jam, and has worked for seminal Silicon Alley companies like iVillage and Time Warner's Pathfinder.com. In 2009 Asher wrote for Literary Kicks a serialized memoir of the Internet industry from 1993 to 2003, focusing on his personal struggles, failures and successes during the crazy years of the dot-com stock bubble (1995 to 2000) and crash (2000 to 2003), as well as his own experience as part of the Internet's growing literary scene.

Asher was born in Flushing, Queens, the third child of Eli Stein, a graphic designer and cartoonist, and Lila Weisberger, a psychologist and poetry therapist. He grew up in Old Bethpage and Hauppauge, Long Island and attended the State University of New York at Albany, graduating in 1984 with degrees in Philosophy and Computer Science. He was married to Meg Wise-Lawrence from 1990 to 1999, and they raised three children, Elizabeth (adopted from Meg's first marriage), Daniel, and Abigail. He was married to Caryn D. Stein from 2008 to 2015.

Before working as a web developer, he worked as a C++ programmer at the JP Morgan bank on Wall Street in New York City. His first published story, Jeannie Might Know, a satire about his job at JP Morgan, appeared in the early online journal Intertext in 1993. He later explained in his memoir that he changed his name to Levi Asher to avoid being detected by co-workers. In 2016 he announced that he is abandoning the use of his pseudonym so that he can utilize both his technology/business background (as Marc Stein) and his literary background (as Levi Asher) on behalf of the new organization Pacifism for the 21st Century.

Asher has published four books under the Literary Kicks imprint, including Why Ayn Rand Is Wrong (and Why It Matters), which argues that Ayn Rand's ethical philosophy of Objectivism is built upon a flawed psychological foundation. He has also written articles for the Huffington Post, the Philadelphia Inquirer, the Quarterly Conversation, the Guardian and Jewcy.

Self-Published works
The Summer of the Mets
Action Poetry
Why Ayn Rand Is Wrong (and Why It Matters)
The Cards I'm Playing: Poker and Postmodern Literature
Chiaroscuro: Assorted Literary Essays

Editor
Coffeehouse Writings for the Web, Editor (Manning, 1997)
Beats In Time: A Literary Generation's Legacy, Editor

References

1961 births
Living people
American male bloggers
American bloggers
Jewish American writers
Jewish pacifists
American pacifists
Jewish bloggers
People from Flushing, Queens
Writers from Queens, New York
University at Albany, SUNY alumni
American satirists
American computer programmers
21st-century American Jews